Augustine Obiora Akubeze is a Nigerian prelate of the Catholic Church and serves as archbishop of the Roman Catholic Archdiocese of Benin City, as of 2011.

On 18 March 2011, Vatican Information Service reported that Pope Benedict XVI had appointed Bishop Augustine Obiora Akubeze of the Roman Catholic Diocese of Uromi, Nigeria, as metropolitan archbishop of the Roman Catholic Archdiocese of Benin City, Nigeria, effective on 28 March 2011. He was born in Kaduna, Nigeria in 1956; he was ordained a priest in 1987 and consecrated a bishop in 2006.

References

Sources
Augustine Obiora Akubeze
Immaculate Conception College in Benin City welcomes new archbishop
Catholic News Service of Nigeria

External links

Benin City
Living people
1956 births
Roman Catholic archbishops of Benin City
Roman Catholic bishops of Uromi